Winnall may refer to 
Winnall, Hampshire, a suburb of Winchester, England
Winnall, Worcestershire, a location in England
Winnall Moors, an area of the flood plain in Winchester city 
Sam Winnall (born 1991), English football striker